Stephen Wilson Tom (born September 20, 1953) is an American actor best known for hosting the HBO comedy series Funny or Die Presents.

Career
He has guest-starred in a number of television series including Parks and Recreation, Major Crimes, Modern Family, How I Met Your Mother, Drake & Josh, ER, NYPD Blue, Sleeper Cell, Two and a Half Men, The King of Queens, Prison Break, The West Wing, The Spoils of Babylon, The Spoils Before Dying, among other television series.  For two seasons, he was the critically acclaimed host of the HBO comedy series Funny or Die Presents.

He also appeared in the feature films Dumb and Dumber To, The Campaign, The Guilt Trip, Seven Pounds, First Daughter, Disney's The Kid, Pulse, Rendition and Transformers: Revenge of the Fallen.

Filmography

Film

Television

References

External links

1953 births
Living people
20th-century American male actors
21st-century American male actors
American male film actors
American male television actors
Male actors from Houston